Witsenia is a genus of flowering plants in the family Iridaceae, first described as a genus in 1782. There is only one known species, Witsenia maura, endemic to Cape Province in western South Africa.

The genus name is a tribute to the botany patron Nicolaas Witsen.

References

Monotypic Iridaceae genera
Endemic flora of South Africa
Iridaceae